Luca Iodice (born 11 August 1978) is a retired Italian football midfielder.

References

1978 births
Living people
Italian footballers
Grasshopper Club Zürich players
FC Zürich players
AC Bellinzona players
FC Schaffhausen players
FC Aarau players
FC Baden players
FC Winterthur players
Association football midfielders